The Kemptville 73's are a Canadian Junior "A" ice hockey team based in Kemptville, Ontario.  They play in the Central Canada Hockey League of the Ottawa District Hockey Association.

History
The team was founded in 1969 as the Kemptville Comets, changing their name in 1973 to coincide with that year.

In the 1996–97 season, the 73's achieved an undefeated season with a win–loss–tie record of 38-0-4 en route to the Eastern Ontario Junior B Hockey League championship. They repeated the championship victory in 1999.

The team moved up from the Eastern Ontario Junior B Hockey League to the Central Junior A Hockey League in 2007. On September 14, 2007, the Kemptville 73's played their first ever Junior "A" hockey game.  At home, the 73's took on the Nepean Raiders but lost the game 5–2.  Anthony Scarpino scored the 73's first ever Junior "A" goal with forty-six seconds left in the first period.  Alex Beaudry started the historic game in net.

On September 23, 2007, the 73's won their first ever Junior "A" hockey game by defeating the Kanata Stallions, at home, by a score of 4–2.

Currently, the team carries a member of the community who has been involved with the program since its inception in 1969. John Guy, a local legend, has been involved with the 73s as the equipment manager. John is known and loved by many in the community for his involvement and comical antics.

On April 8, 2008, Mark Nasca become the first 73 in history to commit to a Division I school when he signed with the Colgate University Raiders  for the 2008–2009 season.

On December 23, 2008, Rob Capellupo was announced as head United States Scout for bringing in players. He was also announced as the teams physical and psychological doctor.

On June 26, 2009, Calvin de Haan was drafted 12th overall by the New York Islanders. de Haan is a former "73".

On June 23, 2012, Vancouver Canucks drafted former 73 Ben Hutton 147th overall.

During the summer of 2017 the 73's changed ownership from Ron and Lisa Tugnutt to Jason York, Joe Jefferies and Paul LeBreux.

Season-by-season results

Notable alumni
Calvin de Haan
Ben Hutton
Travis Vanden Tillaart

References

External links
73's Webpage
EOJHL Webpage
CJHL Webpage

Central Canada Hockey League teams
Ice hockey clubs established in 1969